Jamie Sneddon (born 6 September 1997) is a Scottish professional footballer who currently plays as a goalkeeper for Scottish Championship club Partick Thistle.

Career

Cowdenbeath
Born in Edinburgh, Sneddon began his career as a youth with local side Heart of Midlothian. After spending seven years in development at Tynecastle, Sneddon joined Fife’s Scottish League Two side Cowdenbeath and made over thirty appearances for the club.

Partick Thistle
A highly rated youth player, Sneddon played on trial with Hibernian in 2017, however he signed for (then) Scottish Premiership club Partick Thistle on 15 June 2017. Sneddon found himself third-choice keeper at Thistle behind Tomáš Černý and Ryan Scully. A poor season led to Thistle being relegated from the Premiership, which led to Černy and Scully departing the club.

For the 2018–19 Scottish Championship, Sneddon was promoted to back-up goalkeeper to Cammy Bell, and was first choice when Bell was injured during the season.

Sneddon signed a one-year contract extension at Thistle for the 2019/20 season. Sneddon also received the number 1 jersey, changing from 23.

Sneddon signed a further one-year contract with Thistle in December 2019, until May 2021.

After winning the 2020–21 Scottish League One title with Thistle, Sneddon signed a new one year extension to his contract ahead of the Scottish Championship season.

Sneddon broke Thistle’s club record for consecutive league clean sheets, after a 1-0 win over Hamilton Academical, his sixth league clean sheet in a row. Sneddon then went onto break another club record of consecutive clean sheets in all competitions, setting a new record of eight consecutive clean sheets in all competitions.

Sneddon scored the first goal of his career, scoring a dramatic late equaliser for Thistle in the 95th minute to secure a 1-1 draw away to Cove Rangers, with a header from a corner.

Honours

Club

Partick Thistle
Scottish League One: 2020–21

References

Living people
1997 births
Footballers from Edinburgh
Association football goalkeepers
Scottish footballers
Partick Thistle F.C. players
Heart of Midlothian F.C. players
Cowdenbeath F.C. players
Scottish Professional Football League players